Lick Creek is a stream in Hickman, Maury and Williamson counties, Tennessee, in the United States. It is a tributary of Duck River.

Lick Creek was named for a mineral lick which attracted wildlife.

See also
List of rivers of Tennessee

References

Rivers of Hickman County, Tennessee
Rivers of Maury County, Tennessee
Rivers of Williamson County, Tennessee
Rivers of Tennessee